The meridian 86° east of Greenwich is a line of longitude that extends from the North Pole across the Arctic Ocean, Asia, the Indian Ocean, the Southern Ocean, and Antarctica to the South Pole.

The 86th meridian east forms a great circle with the 94th meridian west.

From Pole to Pole
Starting at the North Pole and heading south to the South Pole, the 86th meridian east passes through:

{| class="wikitable plainrowheaders"
! scope="col" width="120" | Co-ordinates
! scope="col" | Country, territory or sea
! scope="col" | Notes
|-
| style="background:#b0e0e6;" | 
! scope="row" style="background:#b0e0e6;" | Arctic Ocean
| style="background:#b0e0e6;" |
|-
| style="background:#b0e0e6;" | 
! scope="row" style="background:#b0e0e6;" | Kara Sea
| style="background:#b0e0e6;" |
|-
| 
! scope="row" | 
| Krasnoyarsk Krai
|-
| style="background:#b0e0e6;" | 
! scope="row" style="background:#b0e0e6;" | Pyasina Bay
| style="background:#b0e0e6;" |
|-valign="top"
| 
! scope="row" | 
| Krasnoyarsk Krai Tomsk Oblast — from  Kemerovo Oblast — from  Altai Krai — from   Altai Republic — from 
|-
| 
! scope="row" | 
|
|-valign="top"
| 
! scope="row" | 
| Xinjiang Tibet — from 
|-
| 
! scope="row" | 
|
|-valign="top"
| 
! scope="row" | 
| Bihar Jharkhand — from  West Bengal — from  Jharkhand — from  Odisha — from  Jharkhand — from  Odisha — from  Jharkhand — from  Odisha — from 
|-
| style="background:#b0e0e6;" | 
! scope="row" style="background:#b0e0e6;" | Indian Ocean
| style="background:#b0e0e6;" |
|-
| style="background:#b0e0e6;" | 
! scope="row" style="background:#b0e0e6;" | Southern Ocean
| style="background:#b0e0e6;" |
|-
| 
! scope="row" | Antarctica
| Australian Antarctic Territory, claimed by 
|-
|}

See also
85th meridian east
87th meridian east

e086 meridian east